Lindsey Robinson (born 1980) is an English football referee. In 2011, she was one of five referees in the northeastern region of England refereeing matches in the men's Northern Football League Division 2.

Robinson began playing football as a youth and later played for Sunderland and Newcastle United. She earned a degree in sport and exercise development from the University of Sunderland.

In 2018, she was selected to referee the 2018 FA Women's Cup Final. She was an assistant referee at the 2014 and 2016 Finals.

After her appointment as the referee in the 2018 FA Women's Cup Final, she moved to New Zealand to take up the job as Football South's Referee Development Manager. Robinson is now a New Zealand Football appointed referee and often referees games in her home region of Otago

References

Living people
1981 births
English football referees
Women association football referees
English women referees and umpires